Luis Marcos Bronstein (2 June 1946 – 8 January 2014), was an Argentine chess player, International Master (1978), Chess Olympiad individual bronze medal winner (1976).

Biography
In the 1970s and 1980s Luis Marcos Bronstein was one of the leading Argentine chess players. From 1966 to 2003, he regularly participated in the Argentine Chess Championships, which he achieved best result in 1982, when he shared 1st - 5th places but remained in 4th place in the additional tournament.

In 1979 in  Rio de Janeiro Luis Marcos Bronstein participated in the World Chess Championship Interzonal Tournament where ranked in 16th place.

Luis Marcos Bronstein played for Argentina in the Chess Olympiads:
 In 1976, at second reserve board in the 22nd Chess Olympiad in Haifa (+4, =2, -1) and won individual bronze medal,
 In 1978, at second board in the 23rd Chess Olympiad in Buenos Aires (+3, =3, -3),
 In 1982, at first reserve board in the 25th Chess Olympiad in Lucerne (+4, =2, -3).

In 1978, he was awarded the FIDE International Master (IM) title.

References

External links

Luis Marcos Bronstein chess games at 365chess.com

1946 births
2014 deaths
Sportspeople from Córdoba, Argentina
Argentine chess players
Chess International Masters
Chess Olympiad competitors